Gheytariyeh Metro Station is a station of Tehran Metro Line 1. It is located at Shariati Street.

Facilities
The station has a ticket office, escalators, cash machines, toilets, a taxi stand, bus routes, pay phones, water fountains, and a lost and found.

References

External links 

Tehran Metro stations